Anthony Groppi (born 4 July 1997, in Soave) is an Italian motorcycle racer. In 2022 FIM Endurance World Championship he rides for Italian based Team Aviobike in superstock category.

Career statistics

Grand Prix motorcycle racing

By season

Races by year

References

External links

Profile on CIV.tv

1997 births
Living people
Italian motorcycle racers
Moto3 World Championship riders